This is a list of telephone codes for the Solomon Islands.

Country Code: +677
International Call Prefix: 00 or 01

National Significant Numbers (NSN):
five-digits (fixed)
seven-digits (mobile)

Area codes in Solomon Islands

Special numbers

See also 
 Telecommunications in Solomon Islands

References

Solomon Islands
Communications in the Solomon Islands